Ilussia is the thirteenth studio album by the Spanish folk metal band Mägo de Oz. It was released on October 21, 2014 on Warner Music.

Track listing

References

2014 albums
Mägo de Oz albums